Daniela Demjén Pešková (born 23 April 1984) is a Slovak sports shooter. She competed at the 2008 and 2012 Summer Olympics.

References

External links
 

1984 births
Living people
Slovak female sport shooters
Olympic shooters of Slovakia
Shooters at the 2008 Summer Olympics
Shooters at the 2012 Summer Olympics
People from Pezinok District
Sportspeople from the Bratislava Region
European Games competitors for Slovakia
Shooters at the 2015 European Games
ISSF rifle shooters
Universiade medalists in shooting
Universiade silver medalists for Slovakia